HMS Looe was a 44-gun fifth rate warship of the Royal Navy. She grounded on Looe Key off the coast of Florida on 5 February 1744, during the War of Jenkins' Ear.

Construction and commissioning
Looe was ordered on 22 December 1740 from the yards of Thomas Snelgrove, Limehouse to the designs of the 1733 Establishment. She was laid down on 26 January 1741 and launched on 29 December 1741. She was by then the fourth ship of the Navy to be named Looe, after the town of Looe, Cornwall. She was completed by 3 April 1742 at Deptford Dockyard, having cost £6,949.10.0d to build with a further £4,403.7.7d spent on fitting out. She was commissioned in January 1742 under the command of Captain George Carnegie, the sixth Earl of Northesk, for service in the Bay of Biscay.

Service
In 1743 Captain Ashby Utting took command.

Looe was lost off the Florida coast early in the morning of 5 February 1744. She had a captured merchant ship commanded by a Spanish crew in tow when, just after midnight, she struck a reef, followed shortly by the merchant ship. With a priority to escape to avoid capture by the Spanish, the three small boats carried by the frigate were inadequate to carry the 274 survivors, however a Spanish sloop was sighted nearby, which was captured after being chased by some of the crew in the frigate's boats. After the grounded ships had been salvaged for provisions, they were set alight and the survivors departed in the sloop and smaller boats.

The sloop managed to reach Port Royal, South Carolina. One of the smaller boats reached New Providence in the Bahamas, and one was rescued near Cuba. Captain Utting was court-martialled, but acquitted.

The wreckage of the ship and her remaining cargo forms part of the Looe Key National Marine Sanctuary (named after the ship) in the Florida Keys.

References

References
 
 
 
 
 
 

Shipwrecks of the Florida Keys
Maritime incidents in 1744
Frigates of the Royal Navy
Ships built in Limehouse
1741 ships